The IMOCA 60 Class yacht Hugo Boss 2 was designed by Group Finot and launched in the 2007 after being built by Jason Carrington/Neville Hutton in Lymington, England.

Racing Results

References 

Individual sailing yachts
2000s sailing yachts
Sailboat types built in the United Kingdom
Vendée Globe boats
IMOCA 60
Sailboat type designs by Groupe Finot